Irvin is both a given name and a surname. Notable people with the name include:

Given name
Irvin J. Borowsky (1924-2014), American publisher
Irvin Cobb (1876–1944), American author
Irvin Dorfman (1924–2006), American tennis player
Irvin Duguid (born 1969), Scottish musician
Irvin Feld (1918–1984), American impresario
Irvin Kershner (1923-2010), American film director 
Irvin Khoza (born 1948), South African sports administrator
Irvin Mayfield (born 1977), American jazz musician
Irvin McDowell (1818–1885), American soldier
Irvin Shapiro (1906–1989), American film distributor 
Irvin Talton, (dates unavailable), American politician
Earl Irvin West (1920–2011), American church historian
Irvin Westheimer (1879–1980), American philanthropist
Irvin Willat (1890–1976), American film director
Irvin Yalom (born 1931), American author
Irvin Yeaworth (1926–2004), German film director

Surname
Britt Irvin (born 1984), Canadian actress
Bruce Irvin (born 1987), American football player
Cole Irvin (born 1994), American baseball player
David Irvin (1794-1872), Justice of the Wisconsin Territorial Supreme Court
Dick Irvin (1892–1957), Canadian ice hockey player and coach
Fanny M. Irvin (1854–1929), American suffragist
James Irvin (politician) (1800–1862), American politician
James Irvin (fighter) (born 1978), New Zealand mixed martial artist
John Irvin (born 1940), British film director
Leroy Irvin (born 1957), American football player
Leslie Irvin (parachutist) (1895–1966), American parachutist
Marvin Irvin (born 1949), American serial killer
Michael Irvin (born 1966), American football player
Monte Irvin (1919–2016), American baseball player and Hall of Fame inductee
Rea Irvin (1881–1972), American graphic artist
Sam Irvin (born 1956), American director and producer
Tex Irvin (1906–1978), American football player
Tommy Irvin (1929-2017), American politician
William W. Irvin (1779–1842), Justice of the Supreme Court of Ohio

Fictional characters
Bruce Irvin, fictional character in the Tekken series of video games
John Irvin, fictional character in the television series NYPD Blue and Public Morals
Irvin Irving, fictional character in numerous novels by Michael Connelly

See also
Irvin v. Dowd, U.S. Supreme Court case
Justice Irvin (disambiguation)
SS William A. Irvin, American lake freighter
 Earvin
 Ervin (disambiguation)
 Ervine
 Erving (disambiguation)
 Erwan
 Erwin (disambiguation)
 Irvine (disambiguation)
 Irving (disambiguation)
 Irwin (disambiguation)